Bengaluru Karaga is an annual festival celebrated in the heart of Bangalore, primarily by the Vahnikula Kshatriya community. The Karaga festival is generally led by the Vahnikula Kshatriya community.

Gallery

Festival effect from COVID-19 
Bengaluru Karaga was initially cancelled from a decision taken by the Deputy Commissioner, fearing the transmission of COVID-19 from a large scale gatherings of people and local community during the lock down period. "In view of the Centre’s directions and Disaster Management Act, 2005, the festivities should not be held," the order reads. The state government granted permission for the popular festival by relaxing the lock down norms for the Karaga event scheduled to be held on 8 April 2020. 
However the Chief Minister of Karnataka Mr. B S Yeddyurappa has given a green signal go ahead for the Karaga with a rider that not more than five persons to be allowed to congregate this annual festival.

See also 

Sri Dharmarayaswamy Temple Bengaluru

References

External links 

 official website of Sri Sri Sri Dharmarayaswamy Temple Bengaluru
Lock down forces cancellation of Karaga festival due to COVID-19
Bangalore 
Bangalore Karaga 2013 from The Hindu

 Karnataka government allows Karaga festival with a strict rider; timesofindia.indiatimes.com

Culture of Bangalore
Festivals in Karnataka
Events in Bangalore